Zenatia acinaces is a species of moderately large marine bivalve mollusc in the family Mactridae.

References
 Powell A. W. B., William Collins Publishers Ltd, Auckland 1979 

Mactridae
Bivalves of New Zealand
Bivalves described in 1835